Hard Times 2 was a professional wrestling pay-per-view (PPV) event promoted by the National Wrestling Alliance (NWA). It took place on December 4, 2021, in Atlanta, Georgia, at the GPB Studios. It is the second event in the Hard Times chronology.

Production

Storylines
The event featured professional wrestling matches that involved different wrestlers from pre-existing scripted feuds and storylines. Wrestlers portrayed heroes, villains, or less distinguishable characters in scripted events that built tension and culminated in a wrestling match or series of matches. The sixth season of the NWA's weekly flagship program, Power, featured storylines leading up to the event.

For weeks, Melina has been lobbying to get a match for the NWA World Women's Championship against Kamille. After many denials and sneak attacks, Melina won a three-way match on the October 26 EmPowerrr edition of Power, defeating Chelsea Green and Kylie Rae to earn her title match with Kamille at Hard Times.

After Austin Idol cost him an NWA World Television Championship #1 contender's match, Cyon, the NWA's masked mystery man, continued to demand a title match against Idol's main charge Tyrus. On October 27, it was officially announced that Tyrus will defend the television title against Cyon, using his title shot he earned by being on the winning team of the Champions Series, at Hard Times. On November 19, when NWA President Billy Corgan was running down the card for Hard Times, he revealed Tyrus request the match have no time limit and no disqualifications. To help balance this out, Corgan instilled The Pope - who Tyrus defeated to win the championship - as special guest referee.

Since the September 7 episode of Power, an NWA World Tag Team Championship Eliminator tournament has been taking place, with the winners getting a shot against champions La Rebelión (Bestia 666 and Mecha Wolf 450) at Hard Times. The finals will take place on the November 16 episode of PowerrrSurge, where The End (Odinson and Parrow) defeated Hawx Aerie (Luke Hawx and PJ Hawx) to advance to Hard Times.

After By Any Means Necessary, NWA Worlds Heavyweight Champion Trevor Murdoch was having a fan photo shoot inside a steel cage. However, the session was soon interrupted when Mike Knox appeared and attacked Murdoch, locking him and himself in the cage before battering Murdoch with a steel chair. He later would hold up the title over a crowd of wrestlers and Billy Corgan, making his title intentions clear. On November 11, Knox sent in a video, not seeing Murdoch as a true champion and that he's not half the man that his mentor Harley Race ever was. He eventually announced that he would make an appearance at Hard Times. Two days later, Murdoch sent a response to Knox, and demanded Billy Corgan and the NWA Board of Directors make a title match between him and Knox at Hard Times. The match would finally be set by the NWA on November 15 for the main event of Hard Times.

At NWA 73, Judais won a battle royal to become the #1 contender to the NWA National Championship. After two months, and defending his title shot against James Storm and Sal Rinauro, it was announced that Judais will have his match against champion Chris Adonis at Hard Times.

After Nick Aldis lost the NWA Worlds Heavyweight Championship at NWA 73, tensions between him and his stable Strictly Business (Kamille, Chris Adonis, and Thom Latimer) began to rise. It all amounted on the October 5 episode of Power, where Adonis and Latimer were defeated by Aldis and Tim Storm in a tag team match. After the match, Strictly Business brutalized their now-former leader, to the point where Aldis was carried out on a stretcher. Latimer would continue to assault Aldis on behalf of Strictly Business, even attacking him after a match Aldis had in Chorzów, Poland. At By Any Means Necessary, Aldis and Trevor Murdoch defeated Strictly Business in another tag team match. On November 19, Aldis and Latimer were set for a grudge match at Hard Times, with no accompaniments allowed at ringside. Furthermore, if either man is disquailified, they will be suspended for 8 weeks.

When Billy Corgan introduced the full card for Hard Times, he announced the return of the NWA World Junior Heavyweight Championship, with the new champion to be determined in a four-way match at the NWA's next pey-per-view event. Two qualifying matches will take place at Hard Times: On the  preshow, a 12-man gauntlet match will determine an immediate finalist, while Austin Aries and Ring of Honor's Rhett Titus will wrestle on the main show for a spot in the tournament. At the event, it was announced that Darius Lockhart, who was originally supposed to partake in the gauntlet match, was injured, and his spot was filled in by Ricky Morton.

Results

NWA World Tag Team Championship Eliminator Tournament

NWA World Junior Heavyweight Championship qualifying gauntlet match entrances and eliminations

References

External links

National Wrestling Alliance pay-per-view events
2021 in professional wrestling
2021 in Georgia (U.S. state)
Events in Atlanta
Professional wrestling in Atlanta
June 2021 events in the United States
NWA Hard Times